The 14th National Congress of the Chinese Communist Party (Traditional Chinese: 中國共產黨第十四次全國代表大會) was convened from October 12 - 18, 1992.  It was preceded by the 13th National Congress of the Chinese Communist Party. It set in motion the 14th Central Committee of the Chinese Communist Party.  Building Socialism with Chinese Characteristics was advanced.  It was succeeded by the 15th National Congress of the Chinese Communist Party.

References

1992 conferences
1992 in China
National Congress of the Chinese Communist Party